Beyond Fear is the eponymous debut album from Beyond Fear, a heavy metal band formed by ex-Iced Earth/ex-Judas Priest vocalist Tim Owens.

Track listing

Personnel 
Beyond Fear
 Tim "Ripper" Owens – vocals
 John Comprix – lead and rhythm guitar
 Dwane Bihary – rhythm guitar
 Dennis Hayes – bass
 Eric Elkins – drums

Production
 Produced, engineered, and mastered by Jim Morris
 Assistant engineering – Ryan Yanero
 Artwork – Jeremy Morgan
 Photography – Craig James, Jenni James
 Booklet design – Sandra Hiltmann
 Management – Wendy Dio
 Attorney – Jason T. Wells

2006 debut albums
Beyond Fear albums
SPV/Steamhammer albums